Christian Friedrich Ludwig (19 May 1757, Leipzig – 8 July 1823, Leipzig) was a German physician and naturalist. He was the son of botanist Christian Gottlieb Ludwig (1709–1773).

He studied medicine at the University of Leipzig, where in 1779 he obtained his habilitation. In 1780/81 he took a study trip to southern Germany, Switzerland, France, the Netherlands and England. Afterwards in Leipzig, he became an associate professor of medicine (1782) and natural history (1787). In 1796 he was named a full professor of pathology, and he later attained professorships in therapy and materia medica (from 1812) and surgery (from 1820). On two separate occasions he served as rector at the University of Leipzig (1801/02) and 1807/08).

Selected works 
 Primae lineae anatomiae pathologicae, Leipzig 1785.
 Scriptores neurologici minores selecti, 1791
 Historiae insitionis variolarum humanarum et vaccinarum comparatio, 16 parts, Leipzig 1803-1823.
 Handbuch der Mineralogie nach A.G. Werner, 1803 – Handbook of mineralogy according to Abraham Gottlob Werner.
 Einleitung in die Bücherkunde der praktischen Medizin, Leipzig 1806 – Introduction to scientific practical medicine.
 De artis obstetriciae in academia et civitate Lipsiensi incrementis, Leipzig 1811.
 De nosogenia in vasculis minimis, 5 volumes, Leipzig 1809-1819.

References 

1757 births
1823 deaths
Physicians from Leipzig
Leipzig University alumni
Academic staff of Leipzig University
Rectors of Leipzig University
German naturalists
18th-century German physicians
19th-century German physicians